Ian William McLoughlin (born 7 June 1944) is a former boxer. He competed in the men's featherweight event at the 1964 Summer Olympics, representing Northern Rhodesia. At the 1964 Summer Olympics, he lost to Masataka Takayama of Japan in the Round of 32.

References

External links
 

1944 births
Living people
Northern Rhodesia people
Zambian male boxers
Olympic boxers of Northern Rhodesia
Boxers at the 1964 Summer Olympics
Place of birth missing (living people)
Featherweight boxers